Music Ka Maha Muqqabla is a reality show on STAR Plus, which first aired on 19 December 2009. It aimed to bring a new format to music reality shows in India, which is based on teams rather than individuals. The show lasted for a total of 13 weeks.

Six teams, led by their own superstar captains, battled it out in this weekly music competition. The singing superstars included Shaan, Shreya Ghoshal, Mohit Chauhan, Himesh Reshammiya, Mika Singh and Shankar Mahadevan.

Each team consisted of three well-known singers who participated in previous reality TV singing shows and one new singer selected by the captain of the team.

The show was hosted by Ayushmann Khurrana. Each week two captains competed for the highest score in order to win.

The captains that did not compete judged the performances of the singers. There were a total of five rounds in each competition. The audience and the judges gave the score. The show took place in a large outdoor stadium in Mumbai. The stadium consisted of a small section for a few audience members to stand very close to the stage. The rest of the audience sat in the back. Each member of the audience was given a voting machine where they voted when the host asked them to vote. The two competing teams sat on either side of the stage. The captains that did not compete sat in an area in front of the stage. There were background dancers that accompanied the singers when they sang. Two of the captains always sang in the final round and occasionally sang in any other rounds. A "Singer of the Day" Award was given at the end of each episode to a singer selected by the judges. The Grand Finale was won by Shankar Rockstars on 20 March 2010.

Teams

Shreya's Superstars
 Abhas Joshi
 Ujjaini Mukherjee
 Aneek Dhar
 Rehman Ali

Shaan's Strikers
 Debojit Saha
 Anwesha
 Harshit Saxena
 Shadab Faridi

Himesh's Warriors

 Raja Hasan
 Munawwar Ali
 Aishwarya Majmudar
 Vinit Singh

Mohit's Fighters

 Ameya Date
 Vedala Hemachandra
 Ravi Shukla
 Nikita Nigam

Mika's Blasters
 Toshi Sabri
 Himani Kapoor
 Lakhwinder Wadali  
 Tajinder Singh

Shankar's Rockstars(WINNERS)
 Sharib Sabri
 Rahul Vaidya
 Neeti Mohan
 Sanjeev Kumar Jha

Rounds
 Round 1: Aamne Saamne-Two singers from opposing teams compete against each other, sing 2 songs each
 Round 2: Hit Pe Hit -Two singers from opposing teams sing HIT songs 
 Round 3: DJ – Two singers from opposing teams sing DJ mixed songs
 Round 4: Dil Se – Two singers from opposing teams sing songs that connect "dil" of the audience
 Round 5: Aar Paar -The two opposing teams sing a medley with their captains

Scoring

The scoring was based on the judges' average score and the audience's average score. In Rounds 1 to 5 the scoring was out of 20 points (10 from the judges' average score and 10 from the audience's average score). In the final round (Round 5: Muqqabla Aar Yaa Paar), the voting was out of 50 points and only the audience voted.

Episodes
Episode 1: Shaan's Strikers vs Himesh's Warriors
Episode 2: Shankar's Rockstars vs Mika's Blasters
Episode 3: Shreya's Superstars vs Mohit's Fighters
Episode 4: Himesh's Warriors vs Shankar's Rockstars
Episode 5: Shaan's Strikers vs Shreya's Superstars
Episode 6: Mika's Blasters vs Mohit's Fighters
Episode 7: Shreya's Superstars vs Shankar's Rockstars
Episode 8: Shaan's Strikers vs Mohit's Fighters
Episode 9: Mika's Blasters vs Himesh's Warriors
Episode 10: Shankar's Rockstars vs Mohit's Fighters
Episode 11: Shreya's Superstars vs Himesh's Warriors
Episode 12: Shreya's Superstars vs Mika's Blasters
Episode 13: Shaan's Strikers vs Mika's Blasters
Episode 14: Himesh's Warriors vs Mohit's Fighters
Episode 15: Shankar's Rockstars vs Shaan's Strikers

Celebrity guests
Episode 6: Uday Chopra and Priyanka Chopra for the promotion of Pyaar Impossible
Episode 8: Shahid Kapoor and Genelia D'Souza for the promotion of Chance Pe Dance
Episode 11: Shahrukh Khan and Karan Johar for the promotion of My Name Is Khan
Episode 13: Arshad Warsi and Vidya Balan for the promotion of Ishqiya
Episode 17: Sharman Joshi and Tabu for the promotion of Toh Baat Pakki
Episode 18: Farhan Akhtar and Deepika Padukone for the promotion of Karthik Calling Karthik

References

StarPlus original programming
Indian reality television series
2009 Indian television series debuts
Singing talent shows
2010 Indian television series endings
Music competitions in India